2005 Empress's Cup Final was the 27th final of the Empress's Cup competition. The final was played at National Stadium in Tokyo on January 1, 2006. Nippon TV Beleza won the championship.

Overview
Defending champion Nippon TV Beleza won their 7th title, by defeating Tasaki Perule FC 4–1 with Shinobu Ono, Eriko Arakawa and Yuki Nagasato goal.

Match details

See also
2005 Empress's Cup

References

Empress's Cup
2005 in Japanese women's football